Gavalochori is a village of the Chania regional unit on the northwest coast of the island of Crete, in Greece. It is located on Cape Drapan in the Vamos municipality of the Apokoronas region. It is named after the Gavalas family who lived here during the reign of the Venetians. Gavalochori is four kilometers from the coast at Almirida. It is a very old village with an interesting history explained in the local Folklore Museum. The population is around 350 but this number swells in the summer months as tourists, relatives and visitors arrive. The village has many shops including two taverns, two cafes, a pastry shop with cafe bar, the village pre-school, a graphic design Studio, bakery, three grocery stores and a handicrafts shop. There are 14 Greek Orthodox churches in and around the village as well as Venetian arches and wells, Roman tombs and an ancient olive oil factory. Many interesting walks exist around the village.

External links
Gavalochori community website
Hellenic Ministry of Culture and Tourism

Populated places in Chania (regional unit)